Kiss Their Sons is a compilation album by the British pop rock band Transvision Vamp comprising all their singles and selected album tracks. The title is taken from a song originally on the Velveteen album (also included here). It was released on CD in 1998 as both a standard version and as a limited edition double CD featuring extended versions and b-sides.

A number of errors were made to both the track listings and timings on CD2 of the limited edition version (see below).

Track listing
CD1 
"I Want Your Love" – 3:29
"Revolution Baby" – 4:53
"Baby I Don't Care" – 4:37
"Tell That Girl to Shut Up" – 3:06
"The Only One" – 4:19
"Born to Be Sold" – 3:44
"(I Just Wanna) B with U" – 4:21
"If Looks Could Kill" – 4:10
"Ain't No Rules" – 4:47
"Sister Moon" – 4:23
"Landslide of Love" – 3:48
"Every Little Thing" – 3:59
"Kiss Their Sons" – 4:16
"Velveteen" – 9:51
"Bad Valentine" – 3:45

CD2 – 'Mixes and More'
"I Want Your Love" (I Don't Want Your Money Mix) – 6:20 *
"Revolution Baby" (Electra-glide Mix) – 6:01 *
"Baby I Don't Care" (Abigail's Party Mix) – 5:45
"Tell That Girl to Shut Up" (Knuckle Duster Mix) – 4:44 *
"Sister Moon" (Groove On) – 6:06 *
"(I Just Wanna) B with U" (The Nightripper Mix) – 4:53 *
"If Looks Could Kill" (Voodoo Hipster Mix) – 6:37 *
"The Only One" (Extended Mix) – 5:50
"W11 Blues" – 4:51
"Evolution Evie" (Electric Version) – 2:51 *
"Sweet Thing" – 4:50
"God Save the Royalties" – 3:12

(*) The timings for these tracks listed on the sleeve are incorrect and refer to the standard versions.
(I Just Wanna) B with U is incorrectly titled as (I Just Wanna) Be with U.
I Want Your Love (I Don't Want Your Money Mix) is incorrectly titled as I Want Your Love (I Don't Want Your Money).
(I Just Wanna) B with U (The Nightripper Mix) is incorrectly listed as (I Just Wanna) Be with U (Night Tripper Mix).

References

Transvision Vamp albums
1998 compilation albums
1998 remix albums
Universal Records compilation albums
Universal Records remix albums